Phytoecia pretiosa is a species of beetle in the family Cerambycidae. It was described by Faldermann in 1837. It is known from Syria, Azerbaijan, Iraq, Armenia, Iran, Turkey, and possibly Georgia. It feeds on Onopordum carduchorum.

Subspecies
 Phytoecia pretiosa pretiosa Faldermann, 1837
 Phytoecia pretiosa fatima Ganglbauer, 1884

References

Phytoecia
Beetles described in 1837